Beige is variously described as a pale sandy fawn color, a grayish tan,  a light-grayish yellowish brown, or a pale to grayish yellow. It takes its name from French, where the word originally meant natural wool that has been neither bleached nor dyed, hence also the color of natural wool. It has come to be used to describe a variety of light tints chosen for their neutral or pale warm appearance.

Beige began to commonly be used as a term for a color in France beginning approximately 1855–60; the writer Edmond de Goncourt used it in the novel  in 1877. The first recorded use of beige as a color name in English was in 1887.

Beige is notoriously difficult to produce in traditional offset CMYK printing because of the low levels of inks used on each plate; often it will print in purple or green and vary within a print run.

Various beige colors

Cosmic latte

Cosmic latte is a name assigned in 2002 to the average color of the universe (derived from a sampling of the electromagnetic radiation from 200,000 galaxies), given by a team of astronomers from Johns Hopkins University.

Cream

Cream is the color of the cream produced by cattle grazing on natural pasture with plants rich in yellow carotenoid pigments, some of which are incorporated into the cream, to give a yellow tone to white.

The first recorded use of cream as a color name in English was in 1590.

Unbleached silk

Unbleached silk is one of the Japanese traditional colors in use since beginning in 660 CE in the form of various dyes that are used in designing kimonos.

Tuscan

The first recorded use of Tuscan as a color name in English was in 1887.

Buff

Buff is a pale yellow-brown color that got its name from the color of buffed leather.

According to the Oxford English Dictionary, buff as a descriptor of a color was first used in the London Gazette of 1686, describing a uniform to be "A Red Coat with a Buff-colour'd lining".

Desert sand

The color desert sand may be regarded as a deep shade of beige. It is a pale tint of a color called desert.  The color name "desert" was first used in 1920.

In the 1960s, the American Telephone & Telegraph Company (AT&T) marketed desert sand–colored telephones for offices and homes. However, they described the color as "beige". It is therefore common for many people to refer to the color desert sand as "beige".

Ecru

Originally in the 19th century and up to at least 1930, the color ecru meant exactly the same color as beige (i.e. the pale cream color shown above as beige), and the word is often used to refer to such fabrics as silk and linen in their unbleached state. Ecru comes from the French word , which means literally "raw" or "unbleached".

Since at least the 1950s, however, the color ecru has been regarded as a different color from beige, presumably in order to allow interior designers a wider palette of colors to choose from.

Khaki

Khaki was designated in the 1930 book A Dictionary of Color, the standard for color nomenclature before the introduction of computers.

The first recorded use of khaki as a color name in English was in 1848.

Light French beige

Light French beige is the color called beige on the pourpre.com website, a color list widely popular in France.

French beige

The first recorded use of French beige as a color name in English was in 1927.

The normalized color coordinates for French beige are identical to café au lait and Tuscan tan, which were first recorded as color names in English in 1839 and 1926, respectively.

Mode beige

Mode beige is a very dark shade of beige.

The first recorded use of mode beige as a color name in English was in 1928.

The normalized color coordinates for mode beige are identical to the color names drab, sand dune, and bistre brown, which were first recorded as color names in English, respectively, in 1686, 1925, and 1930.

In nature
Fish
 Beige catshark
Mammal
 Beige rabbit

Metaphor
Beige is sometimes used as a metaphor for something which is bland, boring or conventional. In this sense, it is used in contradistinction to more vibrant and exciting (or more individual) colours.

See also 
 RAL 1001 Beige
 List of colors
 Off-white
 Drab (color)
 Beige box

References

External links